The North Gloucestershire Combination Glanville Cup is an annual rugby union knock-out club competition organised by the North Gloucestershire Combination – one of the five bodies that make up the Gloucestershire Rugby Football Union.  It was first introduced during the 1975–76 season, with the inaugural winners being Gordon League 'B', and is the third most important rugby union cup competition in north Gloucestershire, behind the Senior Cup and Junior Cup.

The Glanville Cup is currently open for clubs sides based in Gloucester and north Gloucestershire which are typically the 3rd teams of sides playing in the Senior Cup, although 1st and 2nd XV of smaller clubs in the region have also taken part.  The format is a knockout cup with a first round, quarter-finals, semi-finals and a final to be held at Kingsholm in Gloucester in April–May alongside the Senior and Junior Cup finals.

North Gloucestershire Combination Glanville Cup winners

Number of wins
Matson (20)
Coney Hill (11)
Spartans (4)
Gloucester Old Boys (2)
Gordon League (2)
Chosen Hill Former Pupils (1)
Old Centralians (1)
Old Richians (1)
Tredworth (1)
Widden Old Boys (1)

Notes

See also
 North Gloucestershire Combination
 Gloucestershire RFU
 North Gloucestershire Combination Senior Cup
 North Gloucestershire Combination Junior Cup
 English rugby union system
 Rugby union in England

References

External links
 North Gloucester Combination
 Gloucestershire RFU

Recurring sporting events established in 1975
1975 establishments in England
Rugby union cup competitions in England
Rugby union in Gloucestershire